The 2023 Saint Louis Billikens baseball team will represent the Saint Louis University during the 2023 NCAA Division I baseball season. The Billikens played their home games at Billiken Sports Center as a member of the Atlantic 10 Conference. They will be led by head coach Darin Hendrickson, in his 16th season with the program.

Previous season

The 2022 Saint Louis Billikens baseball team notched a 29–24 (14–9) regular season record earning the third seed and in the 2022 Atlantic 10 Conference baseball tournament. During the tournament, Saint Louis went 1–2 in the tournament.

Preseason

Preseason Atlantic 10 awards and honors
Infielder Cam Redding was named to the All-Atlantic 10 Preseason team.

Coaches poll 
The Atlantic 10 baseball coaches' poll was released on February 7, 2023. Saint Louis was picked to finish fourth the Atlantic 10.

Personnel

Starters

Game log

Statistics

Team batting

Team pitching

Rankings

References

External links 
 Saint Louis Billikens Baseball

Saint Louis Billikens
Saint Louis Billikens baseball seasons
Saint Louis Billikens baseball